Richard Finch (born 9 July 1977) is an English professional golfer.

Career
Finch played on the European Tour, where he had been a member since 2005. He earned his card through Qualifying School in 2004. In his rookie season, he finished 60th on the Order of Merit, but missed out on the Sir Henry Cotton Rookie of the Year award, which went to Gonzalo Fernández-Castaño instead. His best finish in 2005 was as joint runner-up in the Telecom Italia Open.

Finch picked up his first professional win at the 2007 Michael Hill New Zealand Open. He shot a 14-under-par total of 274 (73-65-64-72) to win the tournament by three shots. In May 2008, Finch won the Irish Open at Adare Manor. One the final hole of the tournament, Finch's second shot on the par-5 18th finished on the bank of the river. While playing his third shot, Finch lost his balance and fell into the water. Finch ended the 2008 season 20th on the Order of Merit.

Since 2008 his best finishes have been as runner-up; in the 2010 Avantha Masters, the 2010 Open de Andalucía de Golf, the 2011 Nordea Scandinavian Masters and the 2013 Alfred Dunhill Championship.

Amateur wins
2000 Spanish International Amateur Championship
2002 English Amateur
2003 St Andrews Links Trophy

Professional wins (2)

European Tour wins (2)

1Co-sanctioned by the PGA Tour of Australasia

Results in major championships

Note: Finch only played in The Open Championship.

CUT = missed the halfway cut
"T" = tied

Results in World Golf Championships

"T" = Tied
Note that the HSBC Champions did not become a WGC event until 2009.

Team appearances
Amateur
European Amateur Team Championship (representing England): 2003

See also
2015 European Tour Qualifying School graduates

References

External links

English male golfers
European Tour golfers
Sportspeople from Kingston upon Hull
1977 births
Living people